Patricia Green is an American television producer and writer.

Career
Green worked as a writer and producer on Cagney & Lacey and won two Emmy Awards for her work on the series. The first was in 1985 for Outstanding Writing for a Drama Series. The second was in 1986 for Outstanding Drama Series. She became a supervising producer and writer on China Beach. In 1989 she won a Humanitas Prize for her work on China Beach and was also nominated for an Emmy Award.

She moved on to become a writer and supervising producer for L.A. Law in 1990. She was promoted to executive producer after one season. She was nominated for an Emmy Award for writing in 1991 for her work on the L.A. Law episode "Mutinies On The Banzai". She then became a writer and producer for Chicago Hope and was again nominated for best drama series at the 1996 Emmy Awards. Green also developed Christy (1994–95), which included a major role for Cagney & Lacey co-star Tyne Daly.

She became a consulting producer for The District in 2002.

Awards and nominations

External links

American screenwriters
American television producers
American women television producers
American television writers
Living people
Year of birth missing (living people)
American women television writers
21st-century American women